Spirulina is a genus of cyanobacteria.

Species 

 Spirulina abbreviata 
 Spirulina agilis 
 Spirulina agilissima 
 Spirulina albida 
 Spirulina ardissoni 
 Spirulina baltica 
 Spirulina bayannurensis 
 Spirulina breviarticulata 
 Spirulina cabrerae 
 Spirulina caldaria 
 Spirulina cavanillesiana 
 Spirulina condensata
 Spirulina corakiana 
 Spirulina flavovirens 
 Spirulina funiformis 
 Spirulina gessneri 
 Spirulina gomontiana 
 Spirulina gomontii 
 Spirulina gordiana 
 Spirulina gracilis 
 Spirulina innatans 
 Spirulina labyrinthiformis 
 Spirulina laxa 
 Spirulina laxissima 
 Spirulina legitima 
 Spirulina magnifica 
 Spirulina major 
 Spirulina margaritae 
 Spirulina mariae 
 Spirulina massartii 
 Spirulina maxima 
 Spirulina miniata 
 Spirulina minima 
 Spirulina mukdensis 
 Spirulina nodosa 
 Spirulina nordstedtii 
 Spirulina okensis 
 Spirulina oscillarioides 
 Spirulina platensis 
 Spirulina princeps 
 Spirulina pseudotenuissima 
 Spirulina robusta 
 Spirulina rosea 
 Spirulina schroederi 
 Spirulina sigmoidea 
 Spirulina socialis 
 Spirulina spirulinoides 
 Spirulina subsalsa 
 Spirulina subtilissima 
 Spirulina supersalsa 
 Spirulina tenerrima 
 Spirulina tenuior 
 Spirulina tenuis 
 Spirulina tenuissima 
 Spirulina thermalis 
 Spirulina turfosa 
 Spirulina versicolor 
 Spirulina weissii 

 Spirulina spp

See also 
 Arthrospira

References 

Cyanobacteria genera
Spirulinales